Andrew Griffin (born 17 March 1979) is an English former footballer.

Griffin began his career at Stoke City, where he established a reputation as a solid wing-back defender. His impressive performances for the "Potters" led to him being signed by Newcastle United for a fee of £1.5million in January 1998. He spent six years on Tyneside before moving south to Portsmouth in 2004. He was unable to establish himself as first choice right back at "Pompey" and re-joined his old club Stoke on loan for the 2006–07 season.

Stoke narrowly missed out on a play-off position and so Griffin decided to sign for newly promoted Derby County, however with Derby struggling to compete in the Premier League he joined Stoke for a third time in January 2008. He helped Stoke to claim promotion and was made captain of the side for the 2008–09 season. Griffin lost his place in the side after an on the pitch altercation with Ricardo Fuller at West Ham United in December 2008. He joined Reading in 2010 helping them gain promotion at the second attempt after failing in the play-offs. He was released by Reading in May 2012 and joined Doncaster Rovers in October 2012. He spent two years at Doncaster before ending his career with a short spell at Chester

Club career

Stoke City
Griffin was born in Wigan, Greater Manchester and began his career with Stoke City. He impressed in the clubs youth ranks and he was handed a professional contract in July 1996. He instantly became a regular in the side during the 1996–97 season playing in 36 matches including the final match at the Victoria Ground and in just his first season as a professional he won the clubs player of the year award. In 1997 Stoke moved to the Britannia Stadium but the team struggled all season and with relegation looming Stoke decided to cash in on their most promising prospect selling Griffin to Newcastle United for £1.5million in January 1998.

Newcastle United
Griffin settled quickly in Newcastle and earned call-ups to the England U21 team and also played in the 1999 FA Cup Final. However, he picked up an injury in August 1999 ruling him out for the 1999–2000 season but made a comeback the following season but he again suffered a hernia injury missing another season. Griffin enjoyed something of a resurgence under Bobby Robson and made several solid performances during the 2002–03 season, including in the UEFA Champions League, when his winning goal against Juventus rekindled his side's campaign. Injuries and a failure to get a regular place in the side saw him not offered a new contract by Newcastle at the end of the 2003–04 season.

Portsmouth
Griffin joined Portsmouth in May 2004 on a free transfer. After agreeing to join the Fratton Park club Griffin revealed that he took the advice of former Newcastle teammate Lomana LuaLua. His Pompey career got off to a bad start as he conceded an own goal on his debut in a 2–0 home defeat against Tottenham Hotspur. He played 27 games in 2004–05 and 21 games in 2005–06.

Stoke City loan
By the summer of 2006 he dropped out of Harry Redknapp's plans and in September of that year he was loaned to former club Stoke City. He became first choice right back under Tony Pulis as was a number of loan signings for Stoke in the 2006–07 season which helped turn around the club's fortunes. He scored two goals for Stoke, firstly against Leeds United in a 4–0 victory, and then a "sensational 30-yard strike" against Coventry City. After the match Pulis spoke of his delight at Griffin's goal and performance. "It was an absolutely fantastic goal. It was top drawer. He came through the ranks at Stoke as a kid and that will mean a lot to him. It will have been lovely for him to score because he's got family here. We're delighted that Portsmouth have allowed us to have him on loan." He played 34 matches for Stoke in 2006–07 as Stoke narrowly missed out on a play-off place and Pulis confirmed that he would like to sign Griffin permanently.

Derby County

On 31 July 2007 Griffin signed for Premier League side Derby County on a three-year deal. He was initially Derby's first choice right back, but when Tyrone Mears returned from injury and Paul Jewell replaced Billy Davies as Derby manager, he found his chances in the first team restricted. Griffin was given permission to talk to Stoke City.

Return to Stoke City
On 11 January 2008 Griffin moved back to Stoke City for a fee of £300,000, signing a 4 and a half-year contract. In January 2008, Stoke sold captain John Eustace to Watford. This move saw Griffin named Stoke's new captain despite only being back at the club for three weeks, nonetheless Griffin was delighted describing it as a "proud moment in my career." He was controversially sent-off against Queens Park Rangers on 2 March 2008 as Stoke fell to a 3–0 defeat. Stoke were successful in their appeal. In a match against Watford former teammate John Eustace was sent-off and Griffin branded the Referee's decision as "Pathetic". Griffin missed the final two matches of Stoke's promotion winning 2007–08 campaign due to a torn hamstring. After the season ended Griffin admitted he made the wrong decision to join Derby rather than Stoke in the summer of 2007.

Griffin began the 2008–09 season as first choice right back this was until he was involved in an on pitch altercation with striker Ricardo Fuller away at West Ham United on 28 December 2008 which saw Fuller sent-off. Afterwards the pair publicly apologised for the incident. However Griffin lost his place in the side and Abdoulaye Faye took over as captain for the remainder of the season. He found himself out of the first team in 2009–10 but he did manage to score a dramatic 96th-minute winner in a 4–3 victory over Blackpool in the League Cup.

Reading
On 11 January 2010, he joined Reading on loan for the remainder of the season. He was instrumental in solidifying Reading's back line in the second half of the 2009–10 season which saw Reading rise from the relegation zone at the beginning of January to 9th place by the end of the season. Griffin signed on a permanent 2-year deal on 1 July 2010 for an undisclosed fee. On 2 May 2012, after Reading had won promotion to the Premier League and with Griffin having made only 9 league appearances in the 2011–12 season, the club announced it would not be renewing Griffin's contract.

Doncaster Rovers
On 22 October 2012 Griffin joined Doncaster Rovers on a non-contract basis. He played in 18 matches for Doncaster in 2012–13 as the side won promotion to the Championship. He was informed by manager Paul Dickov that he wouldn't be getting a new contract with the club but allowed him to play with the reserves until he finds a new club.

Chester
Griffin joined Conference Premier side Chester on 27 March 2014. He made just four appearances for Chester before he decided to retire from playing.

Post-retirement
After leaving Chester in the summer of 2014 Griffin became a coach at Newcastle-under-Lyme College.

Career statistics

Honours

Club

 Stoke City
 Football League Championship second-place promotion: 2007–08

 Reading
 Football League Championship: 2011–12

 Doncaster Rovers
 Football League One: 2012–13

Individual
 Stoke City Player of the Year: 1996–97

References

External links

BBC profile 

1979 births
People from Higher End
Footballers from Wigan
Living people
England youth international footballers
England under-21 international footballers
Association football fullbacks
English footballers
Stoke City F.C. players
Newcastle United F.C. players
Portsmouth F.C. players
Derby County F.C. players
Reading F.C. players
Doncaster Rovers F.C. players
Chester F.C. players
English Football League players
Premier League players
FA Cup Final players